The Yale Bulldogs represented Yale University in ECAC women's ice hockey during the 2016–17 NCAA Division I women's ice hockey season. The Bulldogs returned to the ECAC Tournament finishing in seventh place.

Offseason

July 21: Eden Murray was picked to attend the Team Canada Development Camp for a second year.  The development camp identifies candidates to play for Team Canada in international tournaments, including the Olympics.

Recruiting

2015–16 Bulldogs

Schedule

|-
!colspan=12 style=""| Regular Season

|-
!colspan=12 style=""| ECAC Tournament

Awards and honors

Phoebe Staenz, ECAC All-Star, Third Team

References

Yale
Yale Bulldogs women's ice hockey seasons
Yale Bulldogs
Yale Bulldogs